The West Indies cricket team toured UAE to play cricket series against Pakistan in the 2001–02 cricket season. The series was originally scheduled to take place in Pakistan, but was moved to the United Arab Emirates, following the 9/11 attacks in the United States.

Squads

Test series

1st Test

2nd Test

ODI series

1st ODI

2nd ODI

3rd ODI

References

External links
 Series home at ESPN Cricinfo

2002 in Pakistani cricket
2002 in West Indian cricket
International cricket competitions in 2001–02
International cricket tours of the United Arab Emirates